Tanur may refer to:

Places
 Tanur, Malappuram, a town in Kerala, India
 Tanur (State Assembly constituency), Kerala
 Kingdom of Tanur, a medieval principality seated in Tanur, India
 Tanur-e Boland, Iran

Other
 Tabun oven (tannour), name originally given for clay oven (Hebrew and Arabic)